The 1909 Ohio State Buckeyes football team was an American football team that represented Ohio State University during the 1909 college football season.  In their fourth season under head coach Albert E. Herrnstein, the Buckeyes compiled a 7–3 record and outscored their opponents by a combined total of 219 to 76.

Schedule

References

Ohio State
Ohio State Buckeyes football seasons
Ohio State Buckeyes football